Sheikh Mûsa Sor ("Red Moses"; also Sheikh Mûs or Mūsē Sōr) is a Yazidi saint. He is also called the Lord of Air and Wind. Yazidis venerate him as the patron saint of lung and rheumatic diseases. A subdivision of the Adani Sheikh lineage is also named after him.

‘Ebdî Resho (‘Ebd Resh) was a companion of Sheikh Musa Sor.

Musa Sor is associated with winds and the air. He is invocated during winnowing so that winds can help separate grains from hay.

Shrines
There is a mazār (shrine or sanctuary) dedicated to Musa Sor in Bahzane village in the Lalish Valley of northern Iraq.

References

Yazidi holy figures
Kurdish words and phrases